William Hugh McLanachan (born 13 January 1947) was a Scottish amateur football wing half who played in the Scottish League for Queen's Park. He was capped by Scotland at amateur level.

References 

Scottish footballers
Scottish Football League players
Queen's Park F.C. players
Association football wing halves
Scotland amateur international footballers
1947 births
Footballers from Ayr
Living people